Robert Gottschall (September 15, 1915 – January 3, 2005), sometimes credited in films by the stage name Bob Shaw or Robert Shaw, was an American actor.

Gottschall performed with the Dallas Little School of Theatre in 1936 and attracted a talent scout's attention after one semester.

Gottschall enlisted in the United States Army during World War II and served five years. He later re-enlisted and served in the military until 1963.

When he died, just weeks after his wife of over 62 years, Mary Sue Mills, he was buried at the Fort Sam Houston National Cemetery in San Antonio, Texas.

Filmography

 Rose of Washington Square (1939) as Newspaper reporter (uncredited)
 Boy Friend (1939) as Cracker
 Young Mr. Lincoln (1939) as Dancer in Ballroom Seen Dancing with Old Woman (uncredited)
 Charlie Chan in Reno (1939) as College Student (uncredited)
 Quick Millions (1939) as National Park Ranger Barry Frazier
 Here I Am a Stranger (1939) as College Student
 20,000 Men a Year (1939) as Tommy Howell
 The Grapes of Wrath (1940) as Gas Station Attendant #1 in Needles (uncredited)
 Johnny Apollo (1940) as Clerk (uncredited)
 Star Dust (1940) as Boy Leaving Hollywood (uncredited)
 Lillian Russell (1940) as Undetermined Role  (uncredited)
 Sailor's Lady (1940) as Ensign (uncredited)
 Manhattan Heartbeat (1940) in a bit role (uncredited)
 Young People (1940) as Usher (uncredited)
 The Great Profile (1940) as Reporter (uncredited)
 Public Deb No. 1 (1940) as Reporter (uncredited)
 Golden Hoofs (1941) as Party Member (uncredited)
 Adam Had Four Sons (1941) as Chris Stoddard (older)
 Tobacco Road (1941) as Hillbilly (uncredited)
 Ride on Vaquero (1941) as Lieutenant Kirk
 Rise and Shine (1941) as Student Asst. Manager (uncredited)
 Sex Hygiene (1942) as Pool player
 Son of the Guardsman (1946) as David Trent (as Bob Shaw)
 The Shocking Miss Pilgrim (1947) as Secretary (uncredited)
 The Late George Apley (1947) as Bit Role (uncredited)
 Captain from Castile (1947) as Spanish Army Officer (uncredited)
 Berlin Express (1948) as Spy (uncredited)
 Honeysuckle Rose (1980) as Store Clerk
 The Big Brawl (1980) as Man on Beach (as Robert Gottschall)
 Adam (1983) as Father Mike Conboy (as Robert Gottschall)
 The Sky's No Limit (1984) as Dr. Belkin (Last appearance)

References

External links
 
 Memorial Website and Biography

1915 births
2005 deaths
Male actors from Dallas
American male film actors
20th-century American male actors
Burials at Fort Sam Houston National Cemetery